Cuyo Basin is a sedimentary basin in Mendoza Province, western Argentina. The Cuyo Basin has a NNW-SSE elongated shape and is limited to the west by the Sierra Pintada System and to the east by the Pampean pericraton. To the north the basin reaches the area around the city of Mendoza.

Description 
It has two major sub-basins: Cacheuta in the north and Alvear in the south. The northern fringes of Cacheuta sub-basin reaches into San Juan Province. The basin existed already during the Triassic but its current shape is derivative of the Andean orogeny.

The basin originated as a rift basin in the context of extensional tectonics and crustal thinning that followed the Paleozoic Gondwanide orogeny.

Stratigraphy 
The stratigraphy of the Cuyo Basin comprises the following formations:

See also 

 Geological history of the Precordillera terrane
 Colorado Basin, basin to the southeast of Cuyo Basin
 Ischigualasto-Villa Unión Basin, Triassic rift basin to the north of Cuyo Basin
 Neuquén Basin, Mesozoic rift basin to the south of Cuyo Basin
 Paraná Basin, basin to the northeast of Cuyo Basin
 Salta Basin, Mesozoic rift basin to the north of Cuyo Basin

Notes and references

Notes

References

Bibliography 
General
 
 
 
 
 
 

Divisadero Largo Formation
 

Huayquerías Formation
 
 

Mariño Formation

Further reading 
 
 
 

Sedimentary basins of Argentina
Mesozoic rifts and grabens
Foreland basins
Geology of Mendoza Province
Geology of San Juan Province, Argentina